Oh! That Wife of Mine ( Ah! Afti i gynaika mou) was a 1967 Greek film based on a theatre play and was directed by Nikos Tsiforos and Polyvios Vassiliadis.

Plot

A good employee (Papamichail) has dinner with his supervisor (Michalopoulos), hoping for a fast promotion.  But things start to turn bad as his wife (Vougioyklaki) accidentally fights with his boss (who have never met before) inside a taxi which both claimed urgently because of the heavy rain.

Cast

Information
Year of release: 1967
Genre: Comedy
Colour: Black and white
Tickets 428,079

Festival
The film was presented at the 1967 Thessaloniki Film Festival.

External links

Oh! That Wife of Mine mou at cine.gr 

1967 films
Greek comedy films
1967 comedy films
1960s Greek-language films